Paragynoxys is a genus of South American flowering plants in the groundsel tribe within the sunflower family.

 Species

 formerly included
See Paracalia 
 Paragynoxys lopezii - Paracalia lopezii

References

 
Asteraceae genera
Flora of South America
Taxonomy articles created by Polbot